The history of the family name, Rimensberger can be traced to the 10th century in the Alemannic region of Westphalia and Thuringia. The name is closely associated with early Christian movements in these regions.

Over time the spelling and pronunciation of the name started to reflect the different cultural influences. The variations of the name include Riemensberger, Remsberger, Riemensperger, Ringenberg, Rhingenberg, and Ringenburg to mention a few.

During the 13th century and up to the early 17th century the name can be linked to various family branches spread across Westphalia, Silesia, Bavaria and Swabia occupying various estates and serving at various Royal Courts.

During the Thirty Years' War a branch strongly linked to the Roman Catholic Church fled to parts of Switzerland seeking protection under the Abbey of St. Gallen (Kloster St. Gallen) and in the Appenzell region. Remains of a castle named Rimensberg and also small hamlets and hills with that name link the Northeast region of Switzerland with the family. Today, there are regional villages like Lütisburg and Kirchberg with a large constituency of Rimensbergers. Another section settled in Bern, Argovia and central Switzerland.

During the whole period of Europe's industrialisation, many members of the Rimensberger family emigrated to the United States and Canada as well as to South America.

Some notable recent and current representatives are Emil Friedrich Rimensberger, Swiss Social Attaché in Washington, book author, instigator of the Swiss Foreign Information Service; Prof. Peter Rimensberger, eminent international paediatric and neonatal specialist, executive board member of ESPNIC; Georg Rimensberger, artist and art historian; Joseph Rimensberger, Swiss master pastry chef and founder of Fendall Ice cream business in Utah; Wilfried F. Rimensberger, Founding Publisher of Metal Hammer magazine, co-producer and director of the rock music based multi-media project Phenomena and Audiotex pioneer. He is also credited as sourcing producer of Barry Manilow's musical and movie project HARMONY, founder of The Children Arts Academy and Europa - The Woman, the charity arts project in support of a wider European Baccalaureate teaching and the Culham European Academy. In 2014, he launched Millbank Creative Works, a local community based societal enterprise using creativity and sustainability based projects to address social fragmentation in cooperation with ChelseaUAL and Tate Britain. Furthermore, he is also involved in a number of international cultural projects, Malcolm Bruce's first Opera King You's Folly and the multi-media concept EuropeanIcons amongst them. His interested in cross-cultural developments has taken a further dimension with the publication of The Ecyclopedic Paraphrases of Painted Chinese Characters at the end of 2018 where he joined distinguished Chinese historian and artist Zhiyuan Shi and Precursor to Punk Frankie Stein comparing ancient Chinese leadership thinking, artistic expressions with modern Western cultural movements such as Punk and its expressions.

German-language surnames
Surnames of Silesian origin